The 2011 Dutch Basketball Supercup was the inaugural game of the Dutch Basketball Supercup. The game was played between ZZ Leiden, the winner of the 2010–11 Dutch Basketball League, and GasTerra Flames, the winner of the 2010–11 NBB Cup.

Match details

References

Dutch Basketball Supercup
Supercup